HHF Architects is an architectural practice established in Basel, Switzerland by Tilo Herlach, Simon Hartmann and Simon Frommenwiler in 2003.

History 

The practice has built projects in Switzerland, China, Germany, France, Mexico and the United States. Their projects encompass a broad spectrum, including new buildings like the "Labels 2" fashion center in Berlin, interior design, planning tasks like the master plans for the public spaces of the Praille-Acacias-Vernets site in Geneva and La Défense, near Paris, and the development plan for Unterfeld in Zug, Switzerland, as well as objects in the public realm like "Baby Dragon" in China or the "Espinazo del Diablo" viewing platform on the "Ruta del Peregrino" in the Mexican state of Jalisco. HHF Architects intentionally seek close and substantive collaboration with artists and other architects. It is within this context that group projects receiving worldwide attention have emerged, such as the Mexican pilgrimage route "Ruta del Peregrino" and the fruitful collaboration with the Chinese conceptual artist Ai Weiwei, which has been ongoing since 2005.

Shortly after of the office was established, the first works were already being shown at national and international architecture exhibitions. In 2005 HHF were invited to design a contribution to the "Jinhua Architecture and Arts Park" for the Hong Kong & Shenzhen Bi-City Biennale of Urbanism/Architecture.  An invitation followed in 2007 to officially represent Switzerland at the 7th International Architecture Biennale of São Paulo. In 2011 the works created in collaboration with Ai Weiwei were shown as part of the exhibition Ai Weiwei – Art / Architecture at Kunsthaus Bregenz in Austria. The German Architecture Museum (DAM) in Frankfurt am Main showed "Labels 2" in 2012 as part of the exhibition The 23 Best Buildings. HHF was invited to the 13th, 14th and 16th Venice Biennale of Architecture, and the Chicago Architecture Biennial 2017. Their work is part of the permanent collections of Centre Georges Pompidou in Paris, the Architekturmuseum der TU München at the Pinakothek der Moderne in Munich, and the Heinz Architectural Center at the Carnegie Museum of Art in Pittsburgh.

Alongside numerous other national and international distinctions, HHF was named to the "Design Vanguard 2010" by Architectural Record. In 2012, HHF were distinguished with an important Wallpaper Design Award, for which they had also been nominated in 2010. HHF where honored with an  American Architecture Award in 2009 and 2013.

In addition to building, architectural education is of utmost importance to the firm's principals. They were visiting professors at the University of Innsbruck, the Karlsruhe Institute of Technology KIT, MIT School of Architecture and Planning in Cambridge, and have been guest lecturers at the UIA in Mexico City as well as guest critics at numerous universities worldwide. Simon Frommenwiler has been teaching as a visiting professor at École nationale supérieure d'architecture de Strasbourg from 2011 until 2018. Simon Hartmann has been teaching as professor of design at the HTA Fribourg from 2009 until 2017 and is William Henry Bishop Visiting Professor at Yale School of Architecture, 2018. Since fall 2018, Tilo Herlach, Simon Frommenwiler and Simon Hartmann are teaching at Harvard Graduate School of Design.

Profile 
 Established 2003
 Legal form: GmbH
 Partners: Tilo Herlach, Simon Hartmann, Simon Frommenwiler
 Managing Director and Associate: Cella Hubel
 Associates: David Gregori y Ribes, Mariana Santana
 Employees: 25–30 (as of September 2018)
 The team consists of architects, urban designers, designers and drafters

Buildings and projects (selected) 
 2017 – Poissy Galore, observatory and museum in Carrières-Sous-Poissy, Paris, France, in collaboration with AWP, Paris
 2016 – House H, private residence, Starnberg, Germany
 2016 – Byfangweg, apartment building, Basel, Switzerland
 2015 – Lichtstrasse, housing and restaurant, Basel, Switzerland
 2013 – House C, private residence, Ziefen, Switzerland
 2013 – Master plan for all public spaces of La Défense, Hauts-de-Seine, France, in collaboration with AWP, Paris
 2011 – Master plan for the public spaces and urban mobility, Praille-Acacias-Vernets, Geneva, Switzerland
 2011 – House D, Nuglar, Switzerland
 2011 – Guesthouse, Ancram, New York, USA, in collaboration with Ai Weiwei
 2011 – Apartment Quai de Valmy, Paris, France, in collaboration with AWP, Paris
 2010 – Lookout Point on the Ruta del Peregrino, Mexico
 2010 – Labels 2 Fashion Center, Berlin, Germany
 2009 – Sonvida residential development, Bottmingen, Switzerland, with ARchos Architektur
 2009 – Confiserie Bachmann, Basel, Switzerland
 2008 – Artfarm, gallery and art storage for Chambers Fine Art, New York, USA, in collaboration with Ai Weiwei
 2008 – Tsai Residence, New York, USA, in collaboration with Ai Weiwei
 2008 – Overall urban concept for Saarbrücken, Germany, in collaboration with Hans Wirz, Jacques Degermann, and Joel Bertrand
 2008 – Grand Traiano Art Complex, Grottaferrata, Province of Rome, Italy, in collaboration with Johnston Marklee Architects
 2008 – Ordos 100, HHF House, Inner Mongolia, China
 2008 – Kirschgarten Mensa, cafeteria in Kirschgarten secondary school, Basel, Switzerland
 2007 – Dune House, Inner Mongolia, China
 2005 – Treehouse, Guesthouse for the Waterville Golf Resort, Lijiang, Yunnan Province, China, in collaboration with Ai Weiwei (shell construction)
 2005 – Baby Dragon – Pavilion for children, Jinhua Architecture Park, China
 2003 – Master plan for Sonvida residential development, Bottmingen, Switzerland, in collaboration with ARchos Architektur

Distinctions (selected) 
 2018 – Winner of the ArchiDesignClub Award for the French Cultural Building of the Year
 2017 – Inclusion in the architecture collection of the Carnegie Museum of Art, Pittsburgh
 2016 – Nomination for the European Union Prize for Contemporary Architecture "Mies van der Rohe Award"
 2015 – Swiss Architecture Award, 1st Prize, in the category Housing
 2014 – Inclusion in the collection of the Architecture Museum of Technische Universität München, Pinakothek der Moderne, Munich, Germany
 2014 – Nomination for the best single family house ("Das beste Einfamilienhaus" '14) by the Swiss magazine "Das ideale Heim"
 2013 – Award for excellent architecture from Kanton Basel-Landschaft, Kanton Basel-Stadt
 2013 – Award for the best new building from the Basel Heritage Protection
 2013 – Architekturpreis Berlin, Germany
 2013 –  American Architecture Award for Guesthouse, Ancram, NY, USA
 2013 – 1. Prize, buildings of the year 2013 award ("Häuser des Jahres 2013") by the German Architecture Museum and Callwey Verlag
 2013 – Best Architects 14 Award 
 2012 – WAN 21 for 21 Award 
 2012 – AIT-Award 2012 for Public Buildings
 2012 – Wallpaper (magazine) Design Award
 2012 – Nomination for Velux Daylight Award
 2011 – Inclusion in the collection Centre Georges Pompidou
 2010 – Design Vanguard Award 2010 (Chernikov Prize)
 2010 – Swiss Art Awards 2010 Winner
 2010 – Best Architects 11 Award   
 2010 – Wallpaper (magazine) Design Award, nomination
 2010 – Contractworld Award
 2009 –  American Architecture Award for Tsai Residence, Ancram, NY, USA
 2009 – Best Architects 10 Gold Award  
 2008 – Europe 40 under 40 award, European Centre for Architecture Art Design and Urban Studies 
 2008 – Award for Best Architects 09 from the magazine Hochparterre, Swiss television and the Museum für Gestaltung (Museum for Design), Zurich
 2008 – Gold Award for excellent architecture from Kanton Basel-Landschaft, Kanton Basel-Stadt, Basel, Switzerland
 2008 – Best Architects 09 award

Exhibitions (selected) 
 2018 – Contribution to the Luxembourg Pavilion, The architecture of a common ground, 16th Venice Biennale of Architecture, Venice, Italy 
 2017 – Chicago Architecture Biennial, Chicago, USA
 2017 – Swiss Architects Abroad, S AM Swiss Architecture Museum, Basel
 2016 – Topotek 1: Exhibition/Munich, Architekturgalerie München, Munich
 2016 – Schweizweit, S AM Swiss Architecture Museum, Basel
 2015 – The Swiss Architecture Award, Zurich, Switzerland
 2015 – Architettura in Svizzera. Dialogo tra storia e contemporaneità, Chiostro di Palazzo Platamone, Catania, Italy
 2015 – Sacri Monti e altre storie Architettura, Milano Triennale, Castello di Masnago, Varese, Italy
 2015 – Constructing Film. Swiss Architecture in the Moving Image, S AM Swiss Architecture Museum, Basel, Switzerland
 2015 – Une histoire, art, architecture et design, des années 80 à aujourd'hui, Centre Georges Pompidou, Paris, France
 2014 – HHF—Unfinished, Architekturgalerie Munich, Germany
 2014 – Architecture Week Prague, Czech Republic
 2014 – Co-Curation of the Montenegro Pavilion, 14th Venice Biennale of Architecture, Venice, Italy
 2014 – Greek Tourism is not in Crisis, contribution to the Greek Pavilion, 14th Venice Biennale of Architecture, Venice, Italy 
 2014 – CANactions 2014, Kiew, Ukraine
 2014 – Show and Tell – Architekturgeschichte(n) aus der Sammlung, Pinakothek der Moderne, Architecture Museum of Technische Universität München
 2013 – Cut'n'Paste: From Architectural Assemblage to Collage City, MOMA, New York, USA
 2013 – Lookout Architecture with a View, S AM Swiss Architecture Museum, Basel, Switzerland
 2013 – Buildings of the Year 2013, German Architecture Museum, Frankfurt am Main, Germany
 2013 – Architekturpreis Berlin 2013, Labels 2, Kutscherhaus, Berlin, Germany
 2013 – 14. Internationale Architektur Biennale Buenos Aires, Argentina
 2013 – La Défense 2020, exhibition, Cœur Défense, Parvis de La Défense, Hauts-de-Seine, France 
 2013 – Monografische Ausstellung, presentation Unterfeld, Baar, Switzerland
 2013 – Daueraustellung, Pavillon de l'Arsenal, Paris, France
 2013 – Paris la nuit, Pavillon de l'Arsenal, Paris, France
 2013 – Building Images, Photography Focusing on Swiss Architecture, S AM Swiss Architecture Museum, Basel, Switzerland
 2013 – White Cube, Green Maze: New Art Landscapes, Yale School of Architecture, New Haven, USA
 2012 – GLOBAL Design NYU London, The Building Centre, London, UK
 2012 – White Cube, Green Maze: New Art Landscapes, Carnegie Museum of Art, Pittsburgh, USA
 2012 – Invitation to the 13th Venice Biennale of Architecture, Italy
 2012 – WAN 21 for 21 awards exhibition, London, UK
 2012 – Ai Weiwei's Five Houses, AIA Architecture Center Houston, USA
 2012 – Die 23 besten Bauten in Deutschland, German Architecture Museum, Frankfurt am Main, Germany
 2011 – Participation in the exhibition Tatiana Bilbao, Centre Pompidou, Paris, France
 2011 – Kunsthaus Bregenz, Austria
 2011 – Arquitectura Contemporánea Suiza, Cadiz, Spain
 2011 – Le PAV s’expose, Geneva, Switzerland
 2010 – Swiss Art Awards, Swiss Federal Office of Culture, Basel, Switzerland
 2009 – Arch/Scapes, Hong Kong & Shenzhen Bi-City Biennale of Urbanism / Architecture, Hong Kong
 2009 – Arch/Scapes, Today Art Museum, Beijing, China
 2009 – New American Architecture, Chicago, USA
 2009 – Europe 40 under 40, Athens, Greece and Florence, Italy
 2008 – CAUE 92 (Conseil d’architecture, d’urbanisme et de l’environnement des Hauts-de-Seine), Sceaux, Hauts-de-Seine, France
 2008 – Arch/Scapes, Swiss Architecture Museum, Basel
 2007 – Arch/Scapes, official Swiss contribution to the 7th International Architecture Biennale of São Paulo
 2006 – China Contemporary, Nederlands Architecture Institute, Rotterdam, Netherlands
 2005 – Shenzhen Biennale of Urbanism and Architecture, Shenzhen, China

Publications (selected) 
 Landscape of Faith: Interventions Along the Mexican Pilgrimage Route, Lars Müller, 2018, 
 Grundrissfibel, Museumsbauten, Edition Hochparterre, Zürich, 2017, 
 NZZ yearbook Real Estate, Edition 2017/18, NZZ Fachmedien, Luzern, 2017, 
 Architekturpädagogiken, Hochschule Luzern, Park Books, Zürich, 2017, 
 Make New History, Chicago Biennial, Lars Müller, Zurich, 2017, 
 Zukunftsweisend Umbauen, hindernisfrei Wohnen, CMV, Basel, 2017, 
 Architekturführer Deutschland, DOM Publishers, 2017, 
 Spektakuläre Häuser, DVA, München, 2017, 
 Global Design, Prestel, Munich – London – New York, 2015, 
 HHF—Unfinished, 176 pages, HHF, Basel, 2014, 
 Fundamentals, 14th International Architecture Exhibition, La Biennale di Venezia, 576 pages, Marsilio, Venezia, 2014, 
 Show & Tell, Collecting Architecture, 240 pages, Hatje Cantz, 2014, 
 Das beste Einfamilienhaus, 106 pages, Archithema Verlag, 2014, 
 Architecture Now! 9, 480 pages, Taschen, 2013, 
 Best Architects 14, 496 pages, Zinnobergruen, Düsseldorf, 2013, 
 Lookout, Architecture with a View, S AM Swiss Architecture Museum, 116 pages, CMV, 2013, 
 Where Architects Work, 256 pages, Birkhäuser, Bauwelt, 2013, 
 Häuser des Jahres, 273 pages, Callwey, 2013, 
 Building Images, S AM Swiss Architecture Museum, 197 pages, CMV, 2013, 
 White Cube Green Maze: New Art Landscapes, University of California Press, 2012, 
 HHF Architects, 335 pages, Archilife Publishers, Seoul, 2012, 
 Ruta del Peregrino: A Photographic Essay by Iwan Baan, 13th Venice Architecture Biennale, 2012, 
 Deutsches Architekturjahrbuch / German Architectural Annual 2011|12. Prestel Verlag, Munich, 2011, 
 Architecture Dialogues: Positions – Concepts – Visions, Niggli Verlag, 2011, 
 Ai Weiwei: Art | Architecture, Verlag der Buchhandlung Walther König, 2011, 
 Old & New: Design Manual for Revitalizing Existing Buildings, Birkhäuser Verlag, 2010,  
 Shopping 1 Architecture Now!, Taschen Verlag, 2010, 
 Houses 2 Architecture Now!, Taschen Verlag, 2011, 
 AsBuilt, Princeton University Press, 2010
 Architecture Now! 7, Taschen Verlag, 2010, 
 Ai Weiwei: Architecture, daab Verlag, 2010, 
 Gallerie d’Arte, Motta Architecture, 2009, 
 Best Architects 10, Zinnobergrün, 2009, 
 Architecture in China, Taschen Verlag, 2007, 
 Architecture Now! 5, Taschen Verlag, 09.07, 
 Atmosphere: The Shape of Things to Come, Birkhäuser Verlag, 2007, 
 Best Architects 09, Zinnobergrün, 2008,

External links 
HHF architects official website
BauNetz – International architecture office ranking

References 

Swiss architects
Architecture firms of Switzerland